Euphilotes centralis, the central blue, is a butterfly in the family Lycaenidae. It was first described by William Barnes and James Halliday McDunnough in 1917. It is found in North America.

The MONA or Hodges number for Euphilotes centralis is 4366.2.

Subspecies
Two subspecies belong to Euphilotes centralis:
 Euphilotes centralis centralis (Barnes & McDunnough, 1917) i
 Euphilotes centralis hadrochilus Pratt & J. Emmel in T. Emmel, 1998 i
Data sources: i = ITIS, c = Catalogue of Life, g = GBIF, b = BugGuide

References

Further reading

External links

 

Euphilotes
Butterflies described in 1917